The Battle of Kafir Qala was fought in June 1818 between Iran and the Durrani Empire. 

The Persians had captured Herat in 1816 but were forced to abandon it when the Afghans resisted the occupation of the city with an intense guerrilla war on the countryside. In 1818 the Persian Shah, Fath-Ali Shah Qajar, sent his son Prince Mohammad Ali Mirza, known as Dowlatshah, with a huge Persian army to recapture Herat. The Persians marched from Khorasan and met the Afghan army shortly after crossing the border in the town of Kafir Qala.

Battle 
Although the exact numbers are debatable, all sources agree that the Durrani forces outnumbered the Qajars more than 2 to 1. The battle were set up as follows:

On Fateh Khan's right wing was Sherdil Khan with his Sistani, Firozkohi, and Jamshidi tribal forces. On the left side he placed Kohandil Khan with Herati, Taymani, and Darazi troops. The forces of Banyad Khan Hazara, chieftain of the Hazara tribesmen of Bakharz and Jam, were positioned on the right side with Sherdil Khan. Mohammad Khan Qara'i was positioned on the left side with Kohandil Khan.

On the Iranian side, Mirza ʿAbd al-Wahhab Khan “Mutamid al-Daula” and FayzʿAli Khan Qowanlu-ye Qajar formed the right side with their Khwajawand and 'Abd al-Maliki cavalry. In front of the right wing, Astarabadi infrantry were placed with a single piece of artillery. The flank of the right wing included Husayn Qoli Khan Bayat Nishapuri with the infantry of Khorasan.

The battle was inconclusive and both armies retreated. The Hazara forces looted the baggage from both sides.

References

Kafir Qala
Kafir Qala
Kafir Qala
Kafir Qala
History of Herat Province
1818 in Asia